Blaž Rola (born 5 October 1990) is an inactive Slovenian tennis player.

His highest career ranking is No. 78 in singles and No. 186 in doubles. In his career, he has won nine singles and six doubles ITF Futures tournaments, five ATP Challenger in singles and eight in doubles. He represents Slovenia on the Slovenia Davis Cup team. In the 2013 Mediterranean Games in Mersin, Turkey, he won gold in singles and doubles.

Personal life
Rola was born in Ptuj, the oldest Slovenian town, to father Marijan Rola and mother Majda Rola. He was four years old when he started playing tennis and when he was six he joined the Tennis Club Terme Ptuj where he spent the most of his youth. He went to High school in Ptuj. In 2010 he moved to the United States where he studied at and competed in tennis for Ohio State University until 2013. In January 2019 he and his fiancée Vanesa welcomed daughter Izabela. The same year he married his long term girlfriend, Slovenian blogger Vanesa Rola.

College career
He competed for Ohio State University from 2010 to 2013, winning the NCAA doubles championship in 2012 and the NCAA singles championship in 2013.

Professional career

2008–2013
In 2008 he began his professional career when he performed his first tournaments in ITF Futures and ATP Challenger Tour series.

In 2010 he represented Slovenia for the first time in Davis Cup and moved to study and play tennis in United States.

At 2013 Mediterranean Games he won 2 gold medals and made big progress when he reached Top 200 on ATP rankings for the first time in his career. In this period he won 9 Futures singles and 6 doubles titles and 1 title in doubles in Challenger series.

2014: Grand Slam and top 100 debut
Through qualifications he reached the main draw of Grand Slam tournament for the first time at the 2014 Australian Open. He lost in second round against Martin Kližan. With this result he became the fifth Slovene male player to reach the main draw of any Grand Slam.

In May he reached Top 100 in the ATP rankings and played in the qualifications for the 2014 French Open where her lost in the third round to James Ward.

In June he played his first ATP 250 series tournament on grass. At the 2014 Aegon Championships, London and the 2014 Aegon International, Eastbourne he lost in the first round on both occasions. He played in the main draw of 2014 Wimbledon Championships for the first time in his career and lost 1–6, 1–6, 0–6 in the second round against Andy Murray.

2015: Career-high ranking
He reached a career-high ranking in singles of 	No. 78 on 5 January 2015.

2021: Fifth Challenger title
At the 2021 Zadar Open he won his seventh Challenger doubles title partnering his good friend  Blaž Kavčič.

At the 2021 Split Open he defeated Kavčič to win his fifth Challenger singles title.

Challenger and Futures finals

Singles: 27 (14–13)

Doubles: 22 (14–8)

Singles performance timeline 

*

Record against other players
Rola's match record against those who have been ranked in the top 10. Players who have been No. 1 are in boldface

 Nicolas Almagro 0–1
 Richard Gasquet 0–1
 Andy Murray 0–1
 Fernando Verdasco 0–1

* .

Davis Cup

   indicates the outcome of the Davis Cup match followed by the score, date, place of event, the zonal classification and its phase, and the court surface.

References

External links
 
 
 

1990 births
Living people
Ohio State Buckeyes men's tennis players
Slovenian expatriate sportspeople in the United States
Slovenian male tennis players
People from Ptuj
Mediterranean Games gold medalists for Slovenia
Competitors at the 2013 Mediterranean Games
Mediterranean Games medalists in tennis